Warfield is a village in the English county of Berkshire.

Warfield may also refer to:

Places
 Warfield, British Columbia, Canada, a village
 Warfield, Kentucky, United States, a small city
 Warfield, Virginia, United States, a census designated place
 The Warfield, a music venue in San Francisco, California

People
 Benjamin Breckinridge Warfield, American theologian
 Wallis Simpson (Bessie Wallis Warfield), Duchess of Windsor
 Brian Warfield, Irish musician in the band Wolfe Tones
 Catherine Anne Warfield, American author
 David Warfield, American actor
 Derek Warfield, Irish musician in the band Wolfe Tones
 Edwin Warfield, former governor of the State of Maryland
 Eric Warfield, American football player
 Ethelbert Dudley Warfield (1861–1936), American historian and academic administrator
 Fintan Warfield, Irish Sinn Féin politician
 Frank Warfield, American baseball player
 Freda Warfield, American Democratic Party politician
 Henry Ridgely Warfield, 19th-century U.S. Federalist Party politician
 John N. Warfield, American systems scientist
 Justin Warfield, American musician
 Marlene Warfield, American actress
 Marsha Warfield, American actress
 Paul Warfield, American football player
 S. Davies Warfield, American bank president and railroad magnate
 William Warfield, American singer and stage performer

Other
 President Warfield, original name of the passenger liner 
 Warfield Lectures
 Battlefield or battleground